Rail Payanangalil is a 1981 Indian Tamil-language film written, directed and scored by T. Rajendar. The film stars Sreenath, Jyothi, Rajeev and Sivaranjani. It was released on 20 May 1981.

Plot 

The story deals with an unrequited love story between a singer and his fan who eventually ends up getting married to a sadist bent on torturing her questioning her chastity at every turn. The singer, in the end, to prove her chastity, attempts to molest her only to lose his life in the process of establishing her virtue to her husband.

Cast 

Sreenath as Vasanth
Jyothi as Shanthi
Rajeev
Sivaranjani
Master Ananth
Idichapuli Selvaraj
Dilip
Veeraraghavan
T. Rajendar in Cameo appearance

Soundtrack 
The music was composed by T. Rajendar.

Reception 
The film ran for over 175 days in theatres.

References

External links 
 

1980s Tamil-language films
1981 films
Films directed by T. Rajendar
Films scored by T. Rajendar
Films with screenplays by T. Rajendar